The 2005 Missouri Valley Conference men's soccer season was the 15th season of men's varsity soccer in the conference.

The 2005 Missouri Valley Conference Men's Soccer Tournament was hosted by Bradley and won by Creighton.

Teams

MVC Tournament

See also 

 Missouri Valley Conference
 Missouri Valley Conference men's soccer tournament
 2005 NCAA Division I men's soccer season
 2005 in American soccer

References 

Missouri Valley Conference
2005 NCAA Division I men's soccer season